Makhtar "Pape" Gueye (born 4 December 1997) is a Senegalese professional footballer who plays as a forward for Spanish club Zaragoza on loan from the Belgian side Oostende.

Club career

Saint-Étienne
Gueye made his first team debut for AS Saint-Étienne in a 1–1 Ligue 1 away draw Strasbourg on 19 August 2018. He replaced Ole Selnæs in the 84th minute and scored the equaliser four minutes later.

Oostende
In 2020, Gueye moved to Belgian side K.V. Oostende.

Loan to Zaragoza
On 31 August 2022, Gueye joined Zaragoza in Spain on a season-long loan.

Career statistics

Club

References

External links
 AS Saint-Étienne Profile

1997 births
Living people
Association football forwards
Senegalese footballers
AS Saint-Étienne players
AS Nancy Lorraine players
K.V. Oostende players
Real Zaragoza players
Ligue 1 players
Ligue 2 players
Championnat National 2 players
Championnat National 3 players
Belgian Pro League players
Senegalese expatriate footballers
Expatriate footballers in France
Senegalese expatriate sportspeople in France
Expatriate footballers in Belgium
Senegalese expatriate sportspeople in Belgium
Expatriate footballers in Spain
Senegalese expatriate sportspeople in Spain